San Simeon is an unincorporated town in California, and the home of the Hearst Castle landmark and attraction.

San Simeon may also refer to:

San Simeon (horse), an Australian racehorse
San Simeon Handicap, a horse race in the United States
San Simeon State Park, a state park in California
"San Simeon", a song by the band Goldfinger on the album Stomping Ground
Rancho San Simeon, a Mexican land grant in present-day San Luis Obispo County, California

See also
2003 San Simeon earthquake